Rafael Uiterloo (born 7 December 1990) is a Dutch footballer who plays for DVS '33 in the Dutch Derde Divisie. His favourite position on the field is forward.

Career
Born in Amsterdam, Uiterloo joined FC Utrecht from the Ajax academy in the summer of 2008. He made his professional debut in the 2008–09 season opener against PSV (1–5 defeat); he scored the only Utrecht goal. Uiterloo left Utrecht in July 2009 and joined on loan to FC Omniworld. He spent the 2009–10 Eerste Divisie campaign with Omniworld but returned to Utrecht before 1 August because of a meniscus surgery. He joined Baniyas SC in 2010.

On 25 September 2019 Uiterloo joined Derde Divisie club DVS '33.

References

External links
 Voetbal International profile

1990 births
Living people
Association football forwards
Dutch footballers
Dutch expatriate footballers
Dutch sportspeople of Surinamese descent
FC Utrecht players
Almere City FC players
Baniyas Club players
SC Telstar players
FC Eindhoven players
Footballers from Amsterdam
A.V.V. Zeeburgia players
FC Lienden players
Eredivisie players
Eerste Divisie players
Tweede Divisie players
Derde Divisie players
UAE Pro League players
National Premier Soccer League players
Dutch expatriate sportspeople in the United Arab Emirates
Dutch expatriate sportspeople in the United States
Expatriate soccer players in the United States
DVS '33 players